Meteor Garden II is a 2002 Taiwanese drama starring Barbie Shu and F4: Jerry Yan, Vic Chou, Vanness Wu, and Ken Chu. While it is a sequel to the 2001 television series Meteor Garden, which is based on Japanese shōjo manga series , Meteor Garden II is an original series that is not based on the manga. It was produced by Comic Ritz International Production with Angie Chai (柴智屏) as producer and directed by Wang Ming-tai.

The series was broadcast in Taiwan on free-to-air Chinese Television System (CTS) (華視) from 11 November to 25 December 2002. The prequel Meteor Garden was broadcast from 12 April to 16 August 2001 and a supplementary mini-series, Meteor Rain, was produced in 2001 and broadcast following the main series.

This is the second live-action television adaptation of the manga, following its prequel Meteor Garden and followed by Japanese Hana Yori Dango, its sequel Hana Yori Dango Returns, South Korean Boys Over Flowers, and Thai F4 Thailand: Boys Over Flowers. However, it follows an original story penned by writer-producer Angie Chai when the rights to use the F4 name was extended.

Despite the increased budget and new lead cast member Michelle Saram, the series received mixed fan reactions due to the original storyline which deviated greatly from the original manga.

Synopsis
The story opens with the graduation of F4 from Ying De University and subsequently focuses on their life after graduation. It follows the blossoming love story of Shan Cai (Barbie Shu) and Dao Ming Si (Jerry Yan). The story takes the group to Barcelona where Dao Ming Si had a car accident and suffers memory loss. He then meets another girl, Ye Sha (Michelle Saram), the driver of the other car. Shan Cai on the other hand tries her best to help Dao Ming Si regain his memory. A swimming accident helps Dao Ming Si regain his memory and returns to his first love Shan Cai.

Cast
Jerry Yan as Dao Ming Si
Barbie Hsu as Shan Cai
Vic Chou as Hua Ze Lei
Ken Chu as Xi Men
Vanness Wu as Mei Zuo
Michelle Saram as Ye Sha
Blackie Chen as Hsin
Kingone Wang as Secretary
Figaro Tseng as 
Pace Wu as Ying Xiao Qiao
Lee Kang Yi as Ah Mei
Janine Chang as Xi Men's secretary
Winnie Chien as Teng Tang Jing
Megan Lai as Mimi

Soundtrack
Opening theme song: "絕不能失去你" (Can't Lose You) – F4
Ending theme song: "煙火的季節" (Season of Fireworks) – F4
Yo Te Amo – Chayanne
Blue – Chantal Kreviazuk
Broken Vow – Lara Fabian
(They Long To Be) Close to You – 歐定興 (Edward Ou)
Te Quiero, Te Quiero – Chano
Happy – Alexia
Words – F. R. David
I Love You All the Way – Janie Fricke
Blue – Kenny Loggins
I'll Never Fall in Love Again – Deacon Blue
When I See You Smile – Bad English
Doraemon no Uta (Opening Theme Song)
Concierto de Aranjuez – Chano

See also
Meteor Garden
Meteor Rain

References

External links
 CTS Meteor Garden II official homepage

Boys Over Flowers
Chinese Television System original programming
Television shows filmed in Taiwan
Television shows filmed in Spain
2002 Taiwanese television series debuts
2002 Taiwanese television series endings
Fiction about amnesia